Goodenough may refer to:

Places
Goodenough College, London, England
Goodenough Island, Papua New Guinean island
Cape Goodenough, Antarctica

People

Goodenough baronets (created 1943)
Edmund Goodenough (1786–1845), English churchman
Erwin R. Goodenough (1893–1965), American academic
Florence Goodenough (1886–1959), American psychologist
Frederick Goodenough (1866–1934), English banker
Ian Goodenough (born 1975), Australian politician
James Graham Goodenough (1830–1875), Royal Navy officer
John B. Goodenough (born 1922), American physicist/chemist and Nobel laureate, known for developing the Li-ion rechargeable battery
Larry Goodenough (born 1953), Canadian ice hockey player
Samuel Goodenough (1743–1827), English scientist, Bishop of Carlisle
Ursula Goodenough (born 1943), American biologist
William Goodenough (1867–1945), Royal Navy admiral
Ward Goodenough (1919–2013), American anthropologist

See also
Good Enough (disambiguation)
Godunov